Conor Olphert (born 28 December 1995) is an Irish cricketer. He made his List A debut on 28 September 2020, for North West Warriors in the 2020 Inter-Provincial Cup. On 11 January 2021, Olphert was added to Ireland's squad as a net bowler for their matches against the United Arab Emirates and Afghanistan. In February 2021, Olphert was part of the intake for the Cricket Ireland Academy. He made his Twenty20 debut on 18 September 2021, for North West Warriors in the 2021 Inter-Provincial Trophy. In May 2022, Cricket Ireland awarded Olphert with a nine-month contract.

In June 2022, Olphert was named in Ireland's Twenty20 International (T20I) squad for their two-match series against India. He made his T20I debut on 26 June 2022, for Ireland against India.

References

External links
 

1995 births
Living people
Irish cricketers
Ireland Twenty20 International cricketers
North West Warriors cricketers
Place of birth missing (living people)